Miles in Paris is a live album by Miles Davis recorded at the Paris Jazz Festival on November 3, 1989. The album includes a cover version of the song Human Nature, recorded by Michael Jackson and written by Steve Porcaro of the rock band Toto. Davis performs with Benjamin Rietveld, Foley, John Bigham, Kei Akagi, Kenny Garrett, and Ricky Wellman.

Track listing
 "Human Nature" (Steve Porcaro)
 "Amandla" (Marcus Miller)
 "Tutu" (Miller)
 "New Blues" (Miles Davis)
 "Mr. Pastorius" (Miller)

Personnel
 Miles Davis – trumpet
 Kei Akagi – keyboards
 John Bigham – percussion
 Kenny Garret – saxophone, flute
 Foley – lead bass
 Benjamin Rietveld – bass
 Ricky Wellman – drums

References

External links
 All About Jazz article

Jazz films
Miles Davis live albums
1990 live albums